The River Brant is a  tributary of the River Witham that flows entirely in the county of Lincolnshire, in the east of England.

In 1855 the River was described as follows;

"Brant, a tributary of the Witham in the western part of the county of Lincoln. This small stream has its rise in several fine springs in the parish of Hough-on-the-Hill, and pursues its humble course in a northern direction, westward of a range of high land."

Name

The origin of the name is from the Old English; brant (meaning "steep", "deep"). Steep being a steeply sloping incline.

Course

The Brant rises on the flank of Summerfields Hill to the south-west of Gelston near Hough-on-the-Hill and curves round such that it flows almost directly north, parallel to the Limestone Lincolnshire Edge. The river flows past Brandon to which it gives its name, then reaches Stragglethorpe where it is joined by The Beck, which drains Fulbeck. At Brant Broughton it meets with its largest tributary the Sand Beck, and then continues north passing the Low Fields of Navenby, Boothby Graffoe and Coleby where it flows to the west of the deserted medieval village of Skinnand and the remains of Somerton Castle. Further north it then reaches its confluence with the River Witham between the villages of Aubourn and South Hykeham.

See also
Upper Witham IDB

References

Brant